Sir Malcolm Rory Colquhoun, 9th Baronet of Luss (born 1947) is a Scottish aristocrat, landowner and school administrator. He founded a successful school in southwest London called Broomwood Hall and Northcote Lodge, which was sold to the Dukes Education family in 2021.

Biography

Early life
He is the son of the late Sir Ivar Colquhoun, 8th Baronet (1916-2008) and his wife Kathleen (née Duncan). His elder sister, Iona, is the Dowager Duchess of Argyll. He was educated at Eton.

Career
Together with his wife, he runs Northcote Lodge and Broomwood Hall, two schools in London. Additionally he is chairman of the Luss Estates Company, which encompasses the ancient clan lands of Colquhoun and Luss.

Aristocratic title
After his father's death, he became Chief of the Clan Colquhoun, 31st of Colquhoun and 33rd of Luss.

Personal life
He is married to Katherine Mears from Canberra, Australia, known as Lady Colquhoun of Luss. He has three children. His heir-apparent is Patrick Colquhoun, Younger of Luss.

References

 

1947 births
Living people
People from London
People educated at Eton College
Baronets in the Baronetage of Great Britain